Charles Lillywhite (dates of birth and death unknown) was an English cricketer. Lillywhite's batting style is unknown.  He was christened at Duncton, Sussex on 11 March 1804.

Lillywhite made a single first-class appearance for Sussex in 1837 against Kent at the Old County Ground, West Malling. In a match which Kent won by 2 wickets, Lillywhite opened the batting in both of Sussex's innings, being dismissed for a duck in their first-innings by Robert Hills and for 4 runs in their second-innings.

References

External links
Charles Lillywhite at ESPNcricinfo
Charles Lillywhite at CricketArchive

People from Duncton
English cricketers
Sussex cricketers
Year of birth missing
Year of death missing